Web-based information displays many benefits of multimedia technology. Using today's fast broadband connection, it's possible to stream sophisticated content to a computer anywhere in the world. This is an advantage for many people as the information can be received and read wherever and whenever it is convenient for them, which can be a crucial factor for a busy executive. A significant amount of interactive multimedia content is now delivered via the internet.

Web information system, or web-based information system, is an information system that uses Internet web technologies to deliver information and services, to users or other information systems/applications. It is a software system whose main purpose is to publish and maintain data by using hypertext-based principles.

A web information system usually consists of one or more web applications, specific functionality-oriented components, together with information components and other non-web components. Web browser is typically used as front-end whereas database as back-end.

References

Web software